Qasim of Astrakhan is the name of:
 Qasim I of Astrakhan (died 1500), ruler of the Khanate of Astrakhan from 1466 to 1490
 Qasim II of Astrakhan (died 1532), ruler of the Khanate of Astrakhan from 1504 to 1532